The 2023 Texas State Bobcats football team will represent Texas State University as a member of the Sun Belt Conference during the 2023 NCAA Division I FBS football season. They will be led by head coach G. J. Kinne, who will be coaching his first season with the team. The Bobcats will play their home games at Bobcat Stadium in San Marcos, Texas.

Previous season

The Bobcats finished the 2022 season 4–8, 2–6 in Sun Belt play to finish in sixth place in the West Division.

Offseason

Coaching changes
On November 27, 2022 the Bobcats fired their head coach Jake Spavital.

On December 2, 2022 the Bobacts hired G. J. Kinne to be their next head coach. He was formely the head coach at Incarnete Word.

On December 13, 2022 the Bobcats hired Mack Leftwich to be their offensive coordinator.

On December 20, 2022 the Bobcats named Kam Martin to be their running backs coach. On the defensive side they hired Matthew Gregg to be their cornerbacks coach and Dexter McCoil Sr. as their safties coach.

On December 22, 2022 the Bobcats hired Jonathan Patke to be their defensive coordinator, additionly the hired Craig Stutzmann to be their recivers coach and pass game coordinator, and they hired Bret Huth as the Assistant Athletic Director, Strength & Conditioning for Footbal.

On December 23, 2022 the Bobcats named Daniel Da Prato as their special team coordinator and associate head coach. They also named Will Bryant as their tight ends coach.

On February 23, 2023 the Bobcats hired Chris Buckner and Clay Jennings. Buckner will be the co-WR coach, and Jennings will be the defensive back coach and the passing game coordinator.

Schedule
The football schedule was announced February 24, 2023.

References 

Texas State
Texas State Bobcats football seasons
Texas State Bobcats football